This is a timeline documenting events of Jazz in the year 1953.

Events

The musical Porgy and Bess was revived, playing in many European cities.

Album releases
Charlie Parker/Dizzy Gillespie: Jazz at Massey Hall
Duke Ellington: Piano Reflections 
Ben Webster: King of the Tenors 
Modern Jazz Quartet: Django
Shorty Rogers: Cool and Crazy
Jay Jay Johnson: Four Trombones
Stan Kenton: Sketches on Standards
Miles Davis: Blue Period
Miles Davis: Young Man with a Horn (also known as Miles Davis, Vol. 1)
Thelonious Monk: Thelonious
Oscar Pettiford: The New Oscar Pettiford Sextet

Standards

Deaths

 April
 23 – Peter DeRose, American Hall of Fame composer of jazz and pop music during the Tin Pan Alley era (born 1900).

 May
 16 – Django Reinhardt, French virtuoso guitarist and composer (born 1910).

 June
 3 – Mike Mosiello, Italian-born American trumpeter (born 1896).
 26 – Julius Foss, Danish composer, organist, and guitarist (born 1879).

 August
 19 – Tiny Kahn, American drummer, arranger, and composer (born 1923).

 November
 21 – Larry Shields, American clarinetist (born 1893).

 Unknown date
 Jimmy "Jammin'" Smith, American trumpet player (born 1926).

Births

 January
 1 – Greg Carmichael, American guitarist, Acoustic Alchemy.
 5 – Paul Wertico, American drummer.
 6 – Jon Eberson, Norwegian guitarist and composer.
 10 – Mike Stern, American guitarist.
 17 – Jeff Berlin, American bassist.
 20 – Andrew Bisset, Australian author, music educator, and singer (died 2005).
 27 – Bob Mintzer, American saxophonist, composer, arranger, and big band leader.
 31 – Big Time Sarah, American singer (died 2015).

 February
 2 – Louis Sclavis, French clarinetist, bass clarinetist, and soprano saxophonist.
 7 – T. K. Blue, American saxophonist.
 18 – Erling Aksdal, Norwegian pianist.
 24 – Rob Burns, English-New Zealand bass guitarist, author, and academic. 
 25 – Reggie Lucas, American guitarist and songwriter (died 2018).

 March
 1 – Gary Braith, French guitarist and composer.
 4 – John Esposito, American pianist.
 11 – Andy Dickens, English jazz trumpeter, singer, and bandleader.
 16 – Kei Akagi, Japanese-American pianist.
 19 – Michele Rosewoman, American pianist.
 21 – Taborah Johnson, Canadian singer and actor.
 22 – John Shifflett, American bassist (died 2017).
 23 – Chaka Khan, American singer-songwriter.
 27 – Masayoshi Takanaka, Japanese guitarist.
 29 – Jørgen Emborg, Danish pianist.

 April
 1 – Randy Crouch, American fiddle player and multi-instrumentalist.
 2
Dick Oatts, American saxophonist, multi-instrumentalist, composer, and educator.
 13
 Charles Foster Johnson, American blogger, software developer, and guitarist.
 Grant Geissman, American guitarist and composer.
 Tom Olstad, Norwegian drummer.
 16 – Kurt Maloo, Swiss singer-songwriter, composer and record producer.
 18 – Danny Gottlieb, American drummer, Lt. Dan Band and Pat Metheny Group.
 20 – James Chance, American saxophonist, keyboard player, songwriter, and singer.
 24 – Trudy Silver, American pianist and composer.
 25 – Per Kolstad, Norwegian pianist, Lava.

 May
 1
 James Newton, American flautist.
 Randy Halberstadt, American pianist, composer, recording artist, author, and teacher.
 2 – James Chirillo, American guitarist, banjoist, and composer.
 4
 Michael Di Pasqua, American drummer and percussionist (died 2016).
 Oleta Adams, American singer and pianist.
 6 – Paul Dunmall, British saxophonist.
 8 – Mike Miller, American guitarist.
 10 – Alex Foster, American saxophonist.
 12 – Odd Riisnæs, Norwegian saxophonist.
 21 – Joanie Bartels, American singer.
 22 – Jon Burr, American upright bassist and author.
 26 – David Torn, American guitarist, composer, and producer.

 June
 2 – Vidar Johansen, Norwegian saxophonist.
 9 – Ken Navarro, Italian-American guitarist and composer
 26 – Gary Valente, American trombonist

 July
 3 – Bruce Kapler, American saxophonist, singer and multi-instrumentalist, CBS Orchestra.
 8 – Ignacio Berroa, Cuban drummer.
 10 – Attila László, Hungarian guitarist and composer.
 13 – Sigurd Ulveseth, Norwegian upright bassist.
 22 – Jimmy Bruno, American guitarist.
 24 – Jon Faddis, American trumpet player, conductor, composer, and educator.
 27 – Edward Wilkerson, American composer, arranger, saxophonist, pianist, and clarinetist.

 August
 4 – Jeff Hamilton, American drummer, Clayton-Hamilton Jazz Orchestra.
 10 – Jennifer Leitham or Lefty, American upright bassist.
 18 – David Benoit, American pianist, composer and producer.
 23 – Bobby Watson, American saxophonist, composer, and educator.
 28 – Michael Gregory, American guitarist, singer, and songwriter.

 September
 1 – Don Blackman, American pianist, singer, and songwriter (died 2013).
 2 – John Zorn, American composer, arranger, producer, saxophonist, and multi-instrumentalist.
 10 – Craig S. Harris, American trombonist.
 11 – Renée Geyer, Australian singer (died 2023).
 14 – Tom Cora, American cellist and composer (died 1998).
 16 – Earl Klugh, American guitarist and composer.
 26
 Dan Knight, American pianist, composer, educator, and author.
 Vic Juris, American guitarist (died 2019).
 28 – Keni Burke, American singer, songwriter, record producer, and multi-instrumentalist.

 October
 2
 Alton "Big Al" Carson, American singer.
 Stein Erik Tafjord, Norwegian tubist.
 7 – Yoshiaki Miyanoue, Japanese guitarist.
 14 – Kazumi Watanabe, Japanese guitarist.
 17 – Joseph Bowie, American trombonist.
 21 – Marc Johnson American upright bassist.
 27 – Robert Irving III, American pianist, composer, arranger and music educator.

 November
 2 – Ernest Dawkins, American saxophonist, Ethnic Heritage Ensemble.
 3 – Azar Lawrence, American saxophonist.
 7 – Erik Balke, Norwegian saxophonist.
 11 – Kahil El'Zabar, American percussionist, multi-instrumentalist, and composer.
 13
 Alex Coke, American saxophonist and flutist.
 Dennis Taylor, American saxophonist and clarinetist (died 2010).
 17 – Federico Ramos, Uruguayan guitarist, arranger, producer, and composer.
 18 – Alan Murphy, English guitarist  (died 1989).
 27 – Lyle Mays, American pianist and composer.

 December
 5 – John Molo, American drummer and percussionist.
 9 – Jill Saward, British singer, musician, and composer, Shakatak.
 10
 Diane Schuur, American singer and pianist.
 Eugenio Colombo, Italian saxophonist and flautist, Italian Instabile Orchestra.
 17
 Ikue Mori, American drummer, composer, and graphic designer.
 John Doheny, American tenor saxophonist and band leader.
 25 – Steve Barta, American-Brazilian jazz pianist.
 28 – Gilberto "Pulpo" Colón Jr., American pianist, composer, arranger, producer, and band leader.

 Unknown date
 Darol Anger, American violinist.
 Hilario Durán, Cuban pianist.
 Kevin Toney, American pianist and composer.
 Paolo Rustichelli, Italian-American pianist, composer, and producer.
 Suzanne Davis, American pianist.

See also

 1950s in jazz
 List of years in jazz
 1953 in music

References

Bibliography

External links 
 History Of Jazz Timeline: 1953 at All About Jazz

Jazz
Jazz by year